Capital punishment is a legal penalty in Chile. It was abolished for civilian offenses in 2001 and is now only in the military code of justice. It remains applicable to military personnel for war crimes and crimes against humanity during wartime. Chile is one of seven countries that has abolished capital punishment "for ordinary crimes only." The method of execution is shooting. The last executions in Chile were of serial killers Carlos Topp Collins and Jorge Sagredo, on January 29, 1985, by firing squad.

Chile voted in favor of the UN Moratorium on the death penalty in 2007, 2008, 2010, 2012, 2014, 2016, 2018, and most recently, in 2020. Chile is a party to the Second Optional Protocol to the International Covenant on Civil and Political Rights, aiming at the abolition of capital punishment. Chile has a reservation under Article 2.1 of the treaty, which allows parties to make a reservation allowing execution "in time of war pursuant to a conviction for a most serious crime of a military nature committed during wartime." Chile signed the treaty on November 15, 2001, and ratified it on September 26, 2008.

Chile voted in favor of the UN moratorium on the death penalty in 2007, 2008, 2010, 2012, 2014, 2016, 2018, and most recently, in 2020.

References

Chile
Law of Chile